Before Election Day of the 2020 United States presidential election, lawsuits related to the voting process were filed in various states. Many of these lawsuits were related to measures taken by state legislatures and election officials in response to the COVID-19 pandemic.

Background 
Prior to the 2020 United States presidential election, the COVID-19 pandemic caused many states to adjust their voting rules and processes. Litigation was initiated by Democrats, seeking measures to ease voting, and Republicans, seeking to block such measures. "[O]ver 230 election-related federal lawsuits were filed from January 1 to October 23, higher than any of the past three presidential election years during the same time period", according to a USA Today analysis. Issues related to mail-in and curbside voting, early voting, voter registration, photo ID and witness signature requirements, and voting rights for convicted felons.

Throughout 2020, the Supreme Court issued at least a dozen orders related to the 2020 primary and general elections. The court's conservative justices have objected to last-minute changes to elections that are ordered by federal judges, saying the power to administer elections lies solely with state legislatures; the court's liberal justices have favored the loosening of election rules. The deciding vote has often fallen to Chief Justice John Roberts, according to Jonathan Adler, a professor at the Case Western Reserve University School of Law. Under Roberts, the court has focused on keeping federal courts out of state elections, and has consistently treated election changes made by state judges or officials more leniently than those made by federal courts.

Summary of pre-election lawsuits

Counts

Case summaries

Arizona

Arizona Democratic Party v. Hobbs 
On June 10, 2020, the Arizona Democratic Party and the Democratic National Committee filed a lawsuit against Arizona Secretary of State Katie Hobbs in federal court, challenging a state law that requires those who vote by mail to correct missing signatures by election day. On September 10, U.S. District Judge Douglas Rayes ruled for the Arizona Democratic Party. On October 6, the U.S. Court of Appeals for the 9th Circuit overruled Rayes, finding that the election day deadline to correct a missing signature imposes a minimal burden on voters.

Mi Familia Vota v. Hobbs 
On September 30, two non-profit groups asked U.S. district court judge Steven Logan to extend the voter registration deadline from October 5, the date set by Arizona state law, to October 23. The groups argued that in light of COVID-19 pandemic, the October 5 deadline is a burden on voters. Judge Logan granted the request, finding that        
"[b]allot access is an extremely important right, and it has been restricted during this unprecedented time." The Republican National Committee joined the suit and appealed Logan's ruling to the U.S. Court of Appeals for the 9th Circuit, which permitted the extension only to October 15, and validated registrations lodged before that date.

California

Gallagher v. Newsom 
Two California State Assembly members, James Gallagher (R-Yuba City) and Kevin Kiley (R-Rocklin), sued Gavin Newsom, the Governor of California, claiming that Newsom did not have the authority to issue an executive order (N-67-20, issued June3, 2020) to mandate all Californians receive mail-in ballots for the November3 general election by invoking the California Emergency Services Act (CESA). On November14, 2020, Sutter County Judge Sarah H. Heckman finalized a ruling saying Governor Newsom overstepped his authority in doing so. The ruling also put a permanent injunction on Newsom, enjoining him from "amend[ing], alter[ing], or chang[ing] existing statutory law or mak[ing] new statutory or legislative policy" via CESA. However, since the legislature had overwhelmingly passed a similar law (AB860; Sen.31–7, Ass.68–5, signed June18) after the executive order, the ruling had no impact on the outcome of the election. The main focus was to ensure that the Governor of California cannot use executive power under other similar circumstances by invoking the California Emergency Services Act.

Michigan

Michigan All. for Retired Americans v. Benson 
On June 2, 2020, the Michigan Alliance for Retired Americans filed suit in Michigan's court of claims against state officials, including Secretary of State Jocelyn Benson, challenging the requirement for mail-in ballots to be received by election day in order to be counted. Judge Cynthia Stephens granted the request, ordering that county clerks must count ballots postmarked by election day and received up to 14 days after election day. The state appeals court overruled Stephens, writing that the lower court "abused its discretion by ordering the extension."

Minnesota

Carson v. Simon 
On September 22, 2020, two Republican presidential elector nominees, James Carson and Eric Lucero, filed a lawsuit in federal court, arguing that a consent decree entered into by Minnesota Secretary of State Steve Simon and the Alliance for Retired Americans Educational Fund is unconstitutional. While Minnesota state law requires mail-in ballots to be received by Election Day in order to be counted, the consent decree extended the deadline for mail-in ballots by one week. The district court denied Carson and Lucero's request, concluding the plaintiffs lacked standing. On October 24, the U.S. Court of Appeals for the 8th Circuit reversed the district court's ruling, finding that “only the Minnesota Legislature, and not the Secretary" could establish rules for conducting elections in the state. The court ordered ballots arriving after 8p.m. on Election Day to be segregated pending possible further proceedings. Secretary of State Simon said votes received after 8p.m. will still be counted unless a court rules otherwise.

Nevada 

One lawsuit was filed in Nevada before and seven were filed after November 3, 2020.

Kraus v. Cegavske 
On October 23, the Nevada Republican Party and the Trump campaign joined a private citizen in filing a lawsuit in the First Judicial District Court of Nevada against Secretary of State Barbara Cegavske and Clark County registrar of voters Joe Gloria, citing alleged problems with the signature verification process. Judge James Wilson rejected the lawsuit, finding the plaintiffs lacked standing. Plaintiffs appealed to the Supreme Court of Nevada. On November 5, a settlement was filed, effectively ending the lawsuit.

New Jersey

Donald J. Trump for President v. Way 
In August 2020, the Trump campaign sued New Jersey state officials in federal court, seeking to overturn an executive order issued by governor Phillip Murphy. In response to the COVID-19 pandemic, Murphy had ordered that mail-in ballots should be sent to all active voters in the state. The Trump campaign argued that the order violates the U.S. Constitution, which gives power to state legislatures to conduct congressional elections and select electors for the U.S. presidency. Thereafter, the New Jersey state legislature enacted legislation to the same effect as the governor's order. In September, the Trump campaign asked U.S. District Judge Michael Shipp to prohibit vote counting before election day, and the counting of mail-in ballots that are not postmarked and received after election day. On October 6, Judge Shipp denied the request.

Pennsylvania

Pennsylvania Democratic Party v. Boockvar 
Pennsylvania Democratic Party v. Boockvar was a case concerning the whether some sort of accommodations should be granted to citizens due to the COVID-19 pandemic. This case was primarily filed in response to the decision of the Commonwealth Court of Pennsylvania in Delisle v. Boockvar from a couple weeks prior in which the court denied statewide injunctive relief for the 2020 Pennsylvania Primaries due to the COVID-19 pandemic. Among the accommodations sought by the Pennsylvania Democratic Party was a request to count ballots received up to 3 days after 8 p.m on Election Day so long as they were not clearly postmarked after Election Day. The case was originally filed by the Pennsylvania Democratic Party against the Secretary of the Commonwealth of Pennsylvania, Kathy Boockvar, in the Commonwealth Court of Pennsylvania on July 10, 2020, but ultimately raised to the Supreme Court of Pennsylvania.  The Supreme Court of Pennsylvania on September 8 decided that "Based on our disposition of all of the claims set forth above, we grant relief ... and hold that  the Election Code permits county boards of election to collect hand-delivered mail-in ballots at locations other than their office addresses including drop-boxes as indicated herein, a three-day extension of the absentee and mail-in ballot received-by deadline is adopted such that ballots mailed by voters via the United States Postal Service and postmarked by 8:00 p.m. on Election Day, November 3, 2020, shall be counted if they are otherwise valid and received by the county boards of election on or before 5:00 p.m. on November 6, 2020; ballots received within this period that lack a postmark or other proof of mailing, or for which the postmark or other proof of mailing is illegible, will be presumed to have been mailed by Election Day unless a preponderance of the evidence demonstrates that it was mailed after Election Day; the poll watcher residency requirement set forth in ... is constitutional."   Starting on September 22, 2020, Pennsylvania State Legislature Republicans led by Joe Scarnati filed applications seeking a stay on the decision of the case.  These applications for stay were unsuccessful in both the Pennsylvania Supreme Court and the United States Supreme Court. The denial of the application filled in the United States Supreme Court was denied in a 4-4 decision due to Justice Amy Coney Barrett not being confirmed yet.  The denial of these applications led to both United States Supreme Court cases Republican Party of Pennsylvania v. Boockvar (No. 20-542) and Scarnati v. Pennsylvania Democratic Party (No. 20-574).

Republican Party of Pennsylvania v. Boockvar and Scarnati v. Pennsylvania Democratic Party 
Republican Party of Pennsylvania v. Boockvar (No. 20-542) and Scarnati v. Pennsylvania Democratic Party (No. 20-574) are two pending United States Supreme Court cases on whether the Supreme Court of Pennsylvania had the authority to provide the injunctive and declaratory relief in Pennsylvania Democratic Party v. Boockvar.  This includes whether they had the authority to provide injunctive relief allowing ballots received in the state after 8 p.m. on Election Day to count. The first of these cases, Republican Party of Pennsylvania v. Boockvar, filed its first petition for writ of certiorari on October 23, 2020. A few days later on October 27, 2020, Scarnati v. Pennsylvania Democratic Party filed its first petition for writ of certiorari. The next day on October 28, 2020, the United States Supreme Court rejected a motion to expedite Republican Party of Pennsylvania v. Boockvar. On November 6, 2020, Justice Samuel Alito ordered all received after 8 p.m on Election Day to be kept and tabulated separately pending the outcome of this litigation. On November 30, 2020, the cases were vided together to allow the two cases to be treated as one and a brief filed in one would apply to the other as well. On December 16, 2020, the case briefs were distributed for the conference occurring on January 8, 2020. Due to Congress counting the electoral votes on January 6, 2020, it seems likely the cases will be dismissed as being moot barring any delay arising from Congress or expediency from the Supreme Court.

Texas

Several lawsuits were filed in Texas prior to the election.

Harris County drive-through voting suits
A number of lawsuits were brought against Harris County, the state's most populous county, challenging its drive-thru voting system set up as one of an array of measures to mitigate COVID-19 infection risk. Joe Straus, a former Republican Speaker of the Texas House, called the lawsuits "patently wrong".

Hotze v. Hollins 
This action was filed on October 28, 2020, in federal court in Houston by Republican activist Steven Hotze and GOP candidates. U.S. District Judge Andrew Hanen dismissed the complaint on November 2, finding that the plaintiffs lacked standing. It was also reported that he stated during the remotely-conducted motion hearing that the Republicans needed to prove an "evil motive" to have the ballots thrown out and finding that they failed to do so. An emergency motion in the United States Court of Appeals for the Fifth Circuit was unsuccessful.

In re Steven Hotze, M.D., Harris County Republican Party, Hon. Keith Nielsen, and Sharon Hemphill 
The Harris County Republican Party was joined by others in filing a mandamus petition with the Texas Supreme Court asking for a stop to drive-through voting in Harris County. The Texas Supreme Court denied the petition on October 22, 2020.

In re Steven Hotze, M.D., Wendell Champion, Hon. Steven Toth, and Sharon Hemphill 
Nearly identical to the previous petition, this original proceeding was filed in the Texas Supreme Court on October 27, 2020. The plaintiffs asked the court to invalidate almost 127,000 votes already cast via drive-through facilities. This motion was denied by the Texas Supreme Court on November 1, 2020.

Texas Democratic Party v. Abbott 
On April 7, 2020, the Texas Democratic Party and several voters filed a lawsuit against state officials in federal court, seeking to change Texas state law that requires voters under age 65 to provide an excuse in order to vote by mail. In May, U.S. District Judge Fred Biery issued a preliminary injunction to allow all eligible voters to vote by mail, ruling that the state's differing treatment of voters based on age violated the Twenty-sixth Amendment to the United States Constitution.

On June 4, a motions panel of the U.S. Court of Appeals for the 5th Circuit put a hold on Judge Biery's ruling pending appeal. The Texas Democratic Party then filed a petition with the U.S. Supreme Court, asking for Judge Biery's ruling to be reinstated, but the justices denied the petition. On September 10, a different panel of the 5th Circuit issued a lengthy merits opinion that vacated Judge Biery's preliminary injunction, finding that the Texas law limiting no-excuse mail-in voting did not violate the Twenty-sixth Amendment. The court sent the case back to the district court for further proceedings on legal claims that the appeals court had not reached, including an equal protection challenge to the differential treatment of voters based on their age under pandemic conditions.

Texas League of United Latin American Citizens v. Abbott 
On October 1, 2020, the Texas League of United Latin American Citizens and the National League of United Latin American Citizens, plus the League of Women Voters and two Texas voters, filed a lawsuit against Texas Governor Greg Abbott in federal district court. The groups sought to block the Governor's order limiting the number of absentee ballot drop-off sites to one per county, arguing that the order violated the U.S. Constitution and federal Voting Rights Act because it imposed burdens on older, sick, and disabled voters and disproportionately affected more populous counties.

U.S. District Judge Robert Pittman agreed and enjoined enforcement of the limit on drop-off sites. On appeal, a motions panel of the U.S. Court of Appeals for the 5th Circuit sided with the state, finding that the Governor's order "abridges no one's right to vote". The court placed an immediate stay on Judge Pittman's order, allowing the limit on drop-off sites to remain in place through the remainder of the 2020 U.S. presidential election season. The Texas Supreme Court followed the Fifth Circuit in denying a similar challenge by different plaintiffs in a parallel case litigated in state court, although the latter relied on state law, rather than federal law.

Washington

Washington v. Trump
State of Washington v. Trump (No. 1:20-cv-03127) hinged on whether recent changes announced to the United States Postal Service violate federal administrative rulemaking requirements and infringe upon the rights of states to regulate elections under the Constitution. On October 30, 2020, the court issued an order regarding election mail.

See also
Post-election lawsuits related to the 2020 U.S. presidential election

References

2020 United States presidential election
Controversies of the 2020 United States presidential election
2020 United States presidential election